The dusky Canada goose (Branta canadensis occidentalis) is a subspecies of the Canada goose. They are the darkest variant, similar to the Pacific cackling goose. Tagged dusky geese have red bands with white letters on them attached to their neck. They represent one of the smallest populations of Canada goose in the Pacific Northwest.

Description
The dusky Canada goose is the darkest of the subspecies of the Canada goose. They have a warm brown breast and body, contrasting the buff breast and gray body of other subspecies. Dusky Canada geese represent one of the smallest populations of Canada goose in North America.

Taxonomy
The dusky Canada goose is occasionally merged with the Vancouver Canada goose (B. c. fulva), but the latter is larger and largely nonmigratory and found from southern Alaska to northern Vancouver Island, British Columbia. Dusky geese, along with the giant Canada goose, are the most closely related birds to the Hawaiian goose, or nene. Based on the genetic analysis, they settled in Hawaii around 500,000 years ago.

Behavior
Dusky Canada geese are often more wary than some of the other subspecies, flying low and inspecting a potential area to land before descending. Their wings molt from around early July to early August. Often, molting individuals will wait in sub-alpine lakes for their feathers to grow back. The dusky Canada goose mainly winters in much of the Willamette Valley and southern Washington and breeds in the southeast Alaskan Copper River Delta and Middleton Island.

Breeding

Breeding populations occur on Middleton Island and the Copper River Delta. Middleton Island contains around 1,500 breeding birds, which is close to the maximum birds the island can handle. New breeding islands have been created to increase the population. However, because the population is in such a limited area, small environmental changes can drastically alter the future outlook of the subspecies. Alaskan predators such as bears and foxes have come in contact with the native breeding population in recent years. Dusky populations have dropped due to this new threat.

References

Geese
Branta